Sydney Observer Magazine, previously known as the Ku-ring-gai Observer, is the North Shore's premium monthly magazine. It is a free publication distributed in the council areas of Ku-ring-gai, Hornsby and Willoughby. We are the only free monthly magazine in KMC LGA.

Sydney Observer Magazine is published by Kamdha Pty Ltd. since 2003. It is a lifestyle magazine which contains news and current affairs relating to the North Shore and has other sections related to property and finance, health, travel, fashion and beauty, dining, music and theatre, arts and entertainment, seniors and a diary of events.

It publishes news and local items of interest to North Shore local readers and covers additional topics of broader interest to people within the greater Sydney metropolitan area. In the past, articles have been submitted to the Australian Senate for further discussion.

Magazine is distributed free of charge to households, retail stores, major shopping centres, libraries, and community centres in the first week of the month. In February 2020, Sydney Observer magazine was redesigned.

References

External links
 Sydney Observer Magazine website

1996 establishments in Australia
Lifestyle magazines published in Australia
Monthly magazines published in Australia
Free magazines
Local interest magazines
Magazines established in 1996
Magazines published in Sydney